Area code 252 is a telephone area code in the North American Numbering Plan (NANP) for the northeastern corner of the U.S. state of North Carolina. The numbering plan area comprises the municipalities of Kinston, Elizabeth City, Greenville, Henderson, Kitty Hawk, New Bern, Roanoke Rapids, Rocky Mount, Morehead City, Warrenton and Wilson. The area code was created on March 22, 1998 in a split of area code 919.

See also
 List of North Carolina area codes
 List of North American area codes

References

External links

List of exchanges from AreaCodeDownload.com, 252 Area Code

Telecommunications-related introductions in 1998
252
252